The Roman question was a dispute regarding the temporal power of the popes as rulers of a civil territory in the context of the Italian Risorgimento. It ended with the Lateran Pacts between King Victor Emmanuel III of Italy and Pope Pius XI in 1929.

International interest 

On 9 February 1849, the Roman Republic took over the government of the Papal States. In the following July, an intervention by French troops restored Pope Pius IX to power, making the Roman question a hotly debated one even in the internal politics of France.

In July 1859, after France and Austria made an agreement that ended the short Second Italian War of Independence, an article headed "The Roman Question" in the Westminster Review expressed the opinion that the Papal States should be deprived of the Adriatic provinces and be restricted to the territory around Rome. This became a reality in the following year, when most of the Papal States were annexed by what became the Kingdom of Italy.

Claims of the Kingdom of Italy

On February 18, 1861, the deputies of the first Italian Parliament assembled in Turin. On March 17, 1861, the Parliament proclaimed Victor Emmanuel II King of Italy, and on March 27, 1861, Rome was declared Capital of the Kingdom of Italy. However, the Italian Government could not take its seat in Rome because a French garrison (which had overthrown the Roman Republic), maintained there by Napoleon III of France, commanded by general Christophe Léon Louis Juchault de Lamoricière, was defending Pope Pius IX. Following the signing of the September Convention, the seat of government was moved from Turin to Florence in 1865.

The Pope remained totally opposed to the designs on Rome of Italian nationalism. Beginning in December 1869, the First Vatican Council was held in the city. Some historians have argued that its proclamation of the doctrine of papal infallibility in July 1870 had political as well as theological causes.

In July 1870, the Franco-Prussian War began. In early August, Napoleon III recalled his garrison from Rome and could no longer protect what remained of the Papal States. Widespread public demonstrations demanded that the Italian government take Rome. The Italian government took no direct action until the collapse of Napoleon at the battle of Sedan. King Victor Emmanuel II then sent Count Gustavo Ponza di San Martino to Pius IX with a personal letter offering a proposal that would have allowed the peaceful entry of the Italian Army into Rome, under the guise of protecting the pope.

According to Raffaele De Cesare:

The Italian army, commanded by General Raffaele Cadorna, crossed the frontier on 11 September and advanced slowly toward Rome, hoping that an unopposed entry could be negotiated. The Italian army reached the Aurelian Walls on 19 September and placed Rome under a state of siege. Pius IX decided that the surrender of the city would be granted only after his troops had put up a token resistance, enough to make it plain that the takeover was not freely accepted. On 20 September, after a cannonade of three hours had breached the Aurelian Walls at Porta Pia, the Bersaglieri entered Rome (see capture of Rome). Forty-nine Italian soldiers and 19 Papal Zouaves died. Rome and the region of Lazio were annexed to the Kingdom of Italy after a plebiscite.

Again, according to Raffaele De Cesare:

Dilemma
Pope Pius IX and succeeding popes Leo XIII, Pius X, Benedict XV, and Pius XI took great care not to recognize the legitimacy of the Italian government following the capture of Rome. Several options were considered, including giving the city a status similar to that of Moscow at the time (which, despite being the capital of Russia, was not the seat of government), but there was widespread agreement that Rome must be the capital to ensure the survival of the new state. However, Victor Emmanuel II of Italy refused to take residence in the Quirinal Palace, and foreign powers were likewise uneasy with the move. The British ambassador noted the apparent contradiction of a secular government sharing the city with a religious government, while the French foreign minister wrote:

If [Italy] would consent to view Florence as the seat of government, it would solve the Papal question. It would show great sense, and the political credit it would thereby garner, as well as the honor, would offer a considerable advantage...Rome, under royal rule—an integral part of the Italian nation, but remaining Holy or, better yet, the Dominant center of the domain of the faith—would lose none of its prestige and would redound to Italy's credit. And conciliation would then come about naturally, because the pope would become accustomed to seeing himself as living in his own home, not having a king around.

However, the government refused such suggestions and the king eventually took up residence in the Quirinal Palace. Regarded by Roman citizens as the ultimate sign of authority in the city, the Quirinal had been built and used by previous popes. When asked for the keys, Pius IX reportedly said, "Whom do these thieves think they are kidding asking for the keys to open the door? Let them knock it down if they like. Bonaparte's soldiers, when they wanted to seize Pius VI, came through the window, but even they did not have the effrontery to ask for the keys". A locksmith was later hired.

Law of Papal guarantees

Italy's Law of Guarantees, passed by the senate and chamber of the Italian parliament on 13 May 1871, accorded the Pope certain honors and privileges similar to those enjoyed by the King of Italy, including the right to send and receive ambassadors who would have full diplomatic immunity, just as if he still had temporal power as ruler of a state. The law was intended to attempt to avoid further antagonizing the pope following unification and was roundly criticized by anti-clerical politicians across the political spectrum, particularly on the left. At the same time, it subjected the papacy to a law that the Italian parliament could modify or abrogate at any time.

Pope Pius IX and his successors refused to recognize the right of the Italian king to reign over what had formerly been the Papal States, or the right of the Italian government to decide his prerogatives and make laws for him. Asserting that the Holy See needed to maintain clearly manifested independence from any political power in its exercise of spiritual jurisdiction, and that the Pope should not appear to be merely a "chaplain of the King of Italy", Pius IX rejected the Law of Papal Guarantees with its offer of an annual financial payment to the Pope.

Despite the Italian state's repeated assurances of the Pope's absolute liberty of movement within Italy and abroad, the popes refused to set foot outside the walls of the Vatican and thereby put themselves under the protection of the Italian forces of law and order, an implicit recognition of the changed situation. Consequently, the description "prisoners of the Vatican" was applied to them, until the Lateran Treaty of 1929 settled the Roman question by establishing Vatican City as an independent state.

During this time, Italian nobility who owed their titles to the Holy See rather than the Kingdom of Italy became known as the Black Nobility as they were considered to be in mourning.

Plans to leave Rome
Several times during his pontificate, Pius IX considered leaving Rome a second time.  He had fled Rome in disguise in November 1848, following the assassination of his Minister of Finance, Count Pellegrino Rossi. One occurrence was in 1862, when Giuseppe Garibaldi was in Sicily gathering volunteers for a campaign to take Rome under the slogan Roma o Morte (Rome or Death). On 26 July 1862, before Garibaldi and his volunteers were stopped at Aspromonte,

Another instance and rumours of others occurred after the Capture of Rome and the suspension of the First Vatican Council. These were confided by Otto von Bismarck to Julius Hermann Moritz Busch:

One of the pope's confidants, Don Bosco, a popular priest-educator well-known for his genuine prophecies, sent Pius IX a note scripted in a prophetic vein: "Let the sentry, the Angel of Israel, stand firm at his post, to guard the fortress of God and the Ark of the Covenant!” Pius IX agreed and remained at his post as a self-imposed prisoner at the Vatican; so did his successors, till the signing of the Lateran Treaty occasioned the recognition of papal liberties.

Lateran Treaty

The Lateran Treaty resolved the Roman question in 1929; the Holy See acknowledged Italian sovereignty over the former Papal States and Italy recognized papal sovereignty over Vatican City. The Holy See limited its request for indemnity for the loss of the Papal States and of ecclesiastical property confiscated by the Italian State to much less than would have been due to it under the Law of Guarantees.

Literature
Historical novels such as Fabiola and Quo Vadis have been interpreted as comparing the treatment of the popes by the newly formed Kingdom of Italy to the persecution of early Christians in the Roman Empire.

See also
Legal status of the Holy See
 Theatre state

Notes

References
 
 
 

  

 (reprint of 1962 ed.)

19th-century Catholicism
20th-century Catholicism
Foreign relations of the Holy See
History of the papacy
Holy See–Italy relations
Italian unification
Kingdom of Italy (1861–1946)
National questions